Marvin R. Pendarvis (born October 13, 1989) is an American politician. He is a member of the South Carolina House of Representatives from the 113th District, serving since 2017. He is a member of the Democratic party.

Education and career
Pendarvis attended Garrett High School where he was a wide receiver on his football team and the University of South Carolina and graduated in 2011 with an undergraduate degree in political science, where he was a member of the Omega Psi Phi fraternity. He received a JDfrom the University of South Carolina in 2014. He works as an attorney in North Charleston.

South Carolina House of Representatives
2017

When long-time Democratic state legislator Jackson Whipper resigned in August 2017 to become a magistrate judge in Charleston County, Pendarvis became a candidate for his seat in District 113. He ran against two candidates — Angela M. Hanyak and Chris Collins — in the Democratic primary. Pendarvis won with 79.9% of the vote. In the general election, he defeated Republican Theron Sandy II of Pinehurst to win by 1,118 votes.

2018

Pendarvis was unopposed in the Democratic primary and general election.

2020

Pendarvis won his primary on June 9, 2020 and was unopposed in the general election on November 3. In June of 2020, he hired his only current major staffer, his communications director, Jackson Hamilton.

2023

After the announcement that North Charleston Mayor Keith Sumney would not run for re-election, Pendarvis declined to run for the seat, expressing his decision to remain in the House of Representatives.

Committee assignments
Medical, Military, Public and Municipal Affairs Committee
Legislative Oversight

Election history

References

Living people
1989 births
Democratic Party members of the South Carolina House of Representatives
21st-century American politicians
Politicians from Charleston, South Carolina
University of South Carolina alumni